Hermetia amboyna is a species of soldier fly in the family Stratiomyidae.

Distribution
Maluku Islands.

References

Stratiomyidae
Insects described in 2001
Diptera of Australasia
Fauna of Indonesia